USS LST-567 was a United States Navy  in commission from 1944 to 1946.

Construction and commissioning
LST-567 was laid down on 20 March 1944 at Evansville, Indiana, by the Missouri Valley Bridge and Iron Company. She was launched on 15 May 1944, sponsored by Miss Elizabeth Funkey, and commissioned on 1 June 1944.

Service history
During World War II, LST-567 was assigned to the Pacific Theater of Operations. She took part in the Philippines campaign, participating in the landings on Leyte in October and November 1944 and the landings at Lingayen Gulf in January 1945. She then took part in the invasion and occupation of Okinawa Gunto in June 1945.

Following the war, LST-567 performed occupation duty in the Far East until early January 1946, when she departed for the United States.

Decommissioning and disposal
After returning to the United States, LST-567 was decommissioned on 28 January 1946 and stricken from the Navy List on 31 October 1947. She was sold for scrapping on 24 May 1948 to the Bethlehem Steel Corporation of Bethlehem, Pennsylvania.

Honors and awards
LST-567 earned three battle stars for her World War II service.

References

NavSource Online: Amphibious Photo Archive LST-567

 

LST-542-class tank landing ships
World War II amphibious warfare vessels of the United States
Ships built in Evansville, Indiana
1944 ships